Pedways (short for pedestrian walkways) are elevated or underground walkways, often connecting urban high-rises to each other, other buildings, or the street. They provide quick and comfortable movement from building to building, away from traffic and inclement weather.

History
The concept of the elevated pedestrian way is credited to Antonio Sant'Elia, an Italian architect whose career was cut short by his death in World War One. He foresaw the city of the future as high rise tower blocks connected by elevated walkways at different levels.

See also

+15 (a.k.a. Plus 15)
Central Elevated Walkway (Hong Kong)
Chicago Pedway
City of London Pedway Scheme
Edmonton Pedway
Footbridge
Footpath
Houston tunnel system
Overpass
Pedestrian separation structure
Shad Thames
Skyway
Underground city

References

External links

Types of streets
Pedestrian infrastructure